Sun orbit may refer to:
 Heliocentric orbit, around the sun
 Orbit of the sun around the Galactic Center